WTIC-TV (channel 61) is a television station in Hartford, Connecticut, United States, serving the Hartford–New Haven market as an affiliate of the Fox network. It is owned by Tegna Inc. alongside Waterbury-licensed CW affiliate WCCT-TV (channel 20). Both stations share studios on Broad Street in downtown Hartford, while WTIC-TV's transmitter is located on Rattlesnake Mountain in Farmington.

The station was established in 1984 as an independent station, securing the Fox affiliation at the network's launch in 1986. The affiliation gave the station ratings success and the backing to launch a local newscast. From 2000 to 2013, the station was co-owned with the Hartford Courant, which led to newsroom collaboration and a significant expansion of local news programming as well as legal cases and criticism of the cross-ownership of the newspaper and the TV station. Tegna acquired WTIC-TV in 2019 as the result of divestitures related to the merger of Tribune Media with Nexstar Media Group.

History

Prior use of channel 61 in Hartford
Even though channel 61 had been allotted to Hartford since the mid-1960s, it was still not used by a full-power TV station by the end of the 1970s. However, there had been some interest in the allocation. Under the name of Kappa Television Corporation, a man from Rowayton applied in 1965 for a construction permit. His proposed station, WUHF-TV, would have focused on local sports and news coverage. It was intended to launch in 1967, but Kappa was unable to raise the money to build the station in the face of increased costs for color television equipment, and in late 1968, the firm filed to sell it to Evans Broadcasting Corporation, a business of Thomas Mellon Evans. The Federal Communications Commission (FCC) approved the deal in April 1970, but Evans never went through with the purchase, and the permit was forfeited in 1971. There was also one group that stated its intention to file for the permit in 1973.

As the full-power allocation of channel 61 lay fallow, the FCC permitted its use by two translator stations during the 1970s. The first was established by Connecticut Public Television (CPTV), which built a translator to improve service to Waterbury in 1973. A second went on the air from Hartford in September 1980, rebroadcasting the programming of Spanish-language station WXTV in the New York City area.

Comparative hearing and construction
The successful advent of subscription television (STV) in the late 1970s led a number of applicants to express their interest in channel 61 in Hartford. The first two groups to do so each had plans to introduce STV on their stations: Golden West Broadcasters, the Los Angeles-based media company owned by Gene Autry, and Hartford Television, a subsidiary of the fledgling Sinclair Broadcast Group.

A third company filed for channel 61 in November 1979. The company was known as Arch Communications, and it was owned by a consortium that included Arnold Chase, the 28-year-old son of developer David Chase (who also owned WTIC and WTIC-FM radio in Hartford) and majority owner; Edna N. Smith, a Hartford educator; Randall Pinkston, a reporter for Hartford's WFSB (channel 3); and James Grasso, son of Connecticut governor Ella T. Grasso. Arnold Chase had become smitten with independent TV after seeing the depiction of a news crew in the movie The China Syndrome. This consortium was joined by a fourth contender, The Great Hartford County Telecasting Corporation, which was associated with an owner of nursing homes and a man with television and real estate interests in Los Angeles.

The FCC designated these four applications, plus a fifth for a station to be located in nearby Middletown, for comparative hearing in August 1981. Two years later, the commission delivered its ruling and awarded the construction permit to Arch Communications in September 1983. Arch announced it would name its station WETG—in memory of Grasso, who had died in 1981—and laid out plans for an independent station, the market's second after WTXX-TV (channel 20), to begin broadcasting in June 1984. By this time, Pinkston had sold his shares in Arch back to the company. The station began to purchase syndicated programming to fill out its broadcast day, helping to raise prices that Connecticut stations paid for syndicated shows. A  tower on Rattlesnake Mountain was approved definitively in July 1984.

Less than two months before going to air, one more surprise was in store from channel 61. Liberalization of the FCC's rules around call signs earlier that year allowed David Chase to grant his son permission—with an FCC waiver—to name the station WTIC-TV, trading off the heritage of the radio stations and increasing its visibility immediately. Arnold Chase had wanted to use the WTIC call sign for some time but could not prior to the rule change. This made channel 61 the second WTIC-TV, as channel 3 had that call sign from 1957 until its sale in 1974 required a rename. The station remained dedicated in Grasso's memory and would use images of Grasso at sign-on and sign-off. The station would also be housed in One Corporate Center, a building owned by David Chase also colloquially known as the "Stilts Building". Channel 61 was cleared by CPTV and by the WXTV translator, which moved to channel 47 in advance of WTIC-TV signing on and is today WUTH-CD.

Early years

After an estimated $10 million in expenditures, WTIC-TV began broadcasting on September 17, 1984. Programming consisted primarily of syndicated reruns, with just one local show on the initial schedule. Jimmy Carter and Eddie Albert were guests of honor at the dedication ceremony, and Bob Steele, who had said the first words on WTIC-TV channel 3 when it started in 1957, did the same for the new WTIC-TV.

WTIC-TV signed on and established itself behind WTXX in the ratings, suffering from the more established syndicated programming inventory of channel 20, which had been an independent outlet since 1982, though such programming purchases as the local rights to air Boston Celtics basketball allowed the new station to make inroads. However, in 1986, an event would change both stations' trajectories. With the start-up of the new Fox network, WTXX and WTIC-TV each pushed to become its Hartford–New Haven affiliate. However, WTXX's signal had more overlap with WNYW, the Fox station in New York, than WTIC-TV, and channel 61 secured the affiliation. By 1988, WTIC-TV had surpassed WTXX in prime time and total-day ratings.

A downturn in the independent stations advertising market in the mid-1980s would take its toll on WTIC-TV's finances at the same time channel 61 was merging into Chase Broadcasting, David Chase's business and the owner of the WTIC radio stations. Disputes with syndicators MCA Television and Embassy Television led to sudden program removals. The merger was approved in September 1986 but not completed until a year later due to an internal review. Chase Broadcasting began to buy media properties outside of Connecticut in 1989, most notably other Fox-affiliated stations: WATL in Atlanta, KDVR in Denver, and WXIN in Indianapolis.

Renaissance Broadcasting ownership
In 1991, Chase Broadcasting announced it would sell some or all of its properties in order to invest in new business ventures in Eastern Europe after the end of the Cold War, particularly successful cable television systems in Poland. While the Chase family would retain the WTIC radio stations for the time being, it sold four of its five Fox affiliates, including WTIC-TV, to Renaissance Broadcasting, a Greenwich company that already owned WTXX. To comply with prevailing FCC regulations, Renaissance sold WTXX to a Roman Catholic non-profit group, Counterpoint Communications; both deals were completed in March 1993. Some syndicated programs from WTXX moved to WTIC-TV. While Renaissance tried to negotiate a local marketing agreement (LMA) with Counterpoint in which it would buy WTXX's entire broadcast day, Counterpoint wanted only a part-time arrangement, and negotiations fell through; eventually, WTXX entered into a part-time LMA with NBC affiliate WVIT (channel 30).

Tribune ownership
On July 1, 1996, Chicago-based Tribune Broadcasting announced that it would acquire Renaissance Communications, by that time the largest non-network owner of Fox affiliates, for $1.13 billion. Two years later, WTIC-TV replaced WVIT as the LMA partner for WTXX.

Tribune's presence in Connecticut media rapidly grew in the years after the LMA was announced. The company's merger with Times Mirror in 2000 brought the television station under the same corporate umbrella as the Hartford Courant newspaper, while Tribune bought WTXX outright in 2001, setting up a lengthy fight over cross-ownership of the newspaper and the TV station. The original FCC order required Tribune to sell either the newspaper or WTXX within six months, though the cross-ownership of the Courant and WTIC-TV would not need to be considered until the television station's license came up for renewal in 2007. Proposed changes in ownership rules and a circuit court ruling nullifying the same led a federal judge in 2005 to order Tribune to sell WTXX. The FCC then gave Tribune a waiver until 2007, which was later extended, to own that station.

In March 2009, Tribune announced that WTIC-TV and WTXX would relocate their studios and offices into the Courant building on Broad Street in Hartford as part of a multiplatform collaboration between the television and newspaper newsrooms; Richard Graziano, the general manager of the television stations, would also become publisher of the Courant. This was the largest of several similar newspaper-television integrations announced by Tribune in the same period. Connecticut attorney general Richard Blumenthal questioned the combination as violating the waiver. In 2010, two other Connecticut newspapers, the Norwich Bulletin and Record-Journal in Meriden, petitioned the FCC to force the breakup of the Connecticut operation in the context of Tribune's then-pending bankruptcy reorganization.

Tribune announced plans to spin off its publishing division into a separate company in 2013; once the split was finalized the next year, WTIC-TV and WCCT-TV remained with the Tribune Company (which retained all non-publishing assets, including the broadcasting, digital media and Media Services units), while its newspapers (including the Courant) became part of the similarly named Tribune Publishing Company. Despite the split, the stations remained in the Courant building.

In 2017, Sinclair Broadcast Group announced it had agreed to purchase Tribune Media for $3.9 billion. The transaction was nullified on August 9, 2018, when Tribune Media terminated the Sinclair deal and filed a breach of contract lawsuit; this followed a public rejection of the merger by FCC chairman Ajit Pai and the commission voting to put the transactions up for a formal hearing.

Tegna ownership
In the wake of the collapse of the Sinclair deal, Tribune agreed to sell itself to Nexstar Media Group for $6.4 billion. Nexstar already owned two stations in Connecticut—New Haven-based ABC affiliate WTNH and WCTX—requiring that it divest either the New Haven stations or WTIC-TV and WCCT-TV. On March 20, 2019, Tegna Inc. announced it would enter the state and purchase WTIC-TV and WCCT-TV from Nexstar upon consummation of the merger as part of the company's sale of nineteen Nexstar- and Tribune-operated stations to Tegna and the E. W. Scripps Company in separate deals worth $1.32 billion. The sale was completed on September 19, 2019.

News operation

The creation of a news operation for channel 61, in the mold of the respected WTIC radio newsroom, was an early and long-held goal for Arnold Chase and his team. At the station's dedication ceremony in 1984, general manager Bruce C. Mayer promised, "As soon as we're ready, and that won't be too long, we're going to present the facts with a first-class news operation in the WTIC tradition." A news studio and newsroom were accommodated in the design of the One Corporate Center studios. However, it was nearly five years before WTIC-TV aired a local newscast, in part because the merger into Chase Broadcasting helped afford the financial backing to make it a reality.

In November 1988, W. Vincent Burke, a former news executive with ABC, was hired to serve as the founding news director. Many anchors expressed interest in presenting the new half-hour 10 p.m. newscast, but even network correspondents were turned down to hire Chase's first choice. Longtime Connecticut news anchor Pat Sheehan, who had recently departed WFSB and was working as an investment banker, agreed to become the face of the new WTIC-TV newscast, meshing with the serious news approach favored by Chase.

The WTIC News at Ten began broadcasting in April 1989. Sheehan was joined by Beth Carroll, who had worked in Springfield, Massachusetts, on the anchor desk. In its early years, one of the most substantial areas of investment—and impact on the overall market—for WTIC-TV news was weather forecasting. The station had the first private Doppler weather radar in the state, which it trumpeted after a major severe weather outbreak on July 10, three months after the newscast hit the air. A private weather forecasting business, the New England Weather Service, was then created as an adjunct to WTIC radio and television. This led to a competition among Connecticut television stations to invest in new weather forecasting equipment. Ratings began to rise as well. At the start of 1991, the station expanded its newscast to seven days a week.

Under Renaissance, the 10 p.m. newscast expanded from 30 minutes to a full hour in 1995, with the second half hour originally featuring an in-depth feature segment, patterned after Nightline, known as "Tonight in Connecticut". After two months of low ratings, "Tonight in Connecticut" was dropped in August 1995. Sheehan would call the short life and quick demise of the segment "one of my greatest disappointments"; he left in 1999.

Beginning in the late 2000s, WTIC-TV began to increase its news output beyond late news. A two-hour morning newscast, the Fox 61 Morning News, began to air in 2008. After moving in with the Courant, noon and 6 p.m. broadcasts were added, the first in a flurry of new news offerings in the years that followed: an expanded morning newscast, 4 p.m. and 11 p.m. newscasts, weekend morning news, and a 5 p.m. newscast.

In July 2009, news reporter Shelly Sindland filed both state and federal complaints alleging age and gender discrimination in the station's newsroom. The Courant coverage of this story came under scrutiny. Newsblues, a blog covering the television news business, reported that the newspaper printed WTIC-TV's reaction before it published a story about the complaint, while a blogger who had been a Courant employee at the time noted that he had been told a story had been posted to the website and then removed after a complaint by management. In 2010, the Connecticut Commission on Human Rights and Opportunities found "reasonable cause" in her complaint, a finding the commission made in just four percent of cases it adjudicated in the preceding year.

Technical information

Subchannels
The station's digital signal is multiplexed:

WCCT-TV serves as Connecticut's ATSC 3.0 (NextGen TV) lighthouse, airing WTIC-TV and other local stations in that format while WTIC-TV broadcasts its main ATSC 1.0 subchannel.

Analog-to-digital conversion
WTIC-TV shut down its analog signal, over UHF channel 61, on June 12, 2009, as part of the federally mandated transition from analog to digital television.

References

External links

 

TIC-TV
Fox network affiliates
Antenna TV affiliates
TBD (TV network) affiliates
True Crime Network affiliates
Twist (TV network) affiliates
Tegna Inc.
Television channels and stations established in 1984
1984 establishments in Connecticut